Paul Brian Becker (born August 1961) is a retired United States Navy admiral and the former Director for Intelligence, Joint Staff (J2).  As the JCS J2, RADM Becker was the principal intelligence advisor to the Chairman of the Joint Chiefs of Staff.

Career 
Paul Becker was commissioned an intelligence officer upon graduation from the United States Naval Academy in 1983.  Significant afloat assignments include intelligence officer with Attack Squadron (VA) 35 (A6E/Intruder) aboard ; temporary assignment aboard battleship, ; intelligence operations officer for the United States 6th Fleet aboard cruiser ; and N2 with Carrier Strike Group 7 aboard .  Shore assignments include: analyst at the Chief of Naval Operations Intelligence Plot; flag aide to the director of Naval Intelligence; intelligence branch/assignments officer at the Bureau of Personnel; Federal Executive Fellow at the Fletcher School of Law and Diplomacy; the American Embassy in Paris as the assistant U.S. Naval Attaché; temporary assignment with the American Embassy in Skopje, Macedonia as the assistant Defense Attaché (during Operation Allied Force), and the director of Operations at the Joint Intelligence Center Pacific, Hawaii.  In addition to service in Afghanistan from 2009 to 2010, his duty with U.S. Central Command (CENTCOM) since 9/11 includes: commanding officer of CENTCOM’s Joint Intelligence Center in Tampa, Florida, from 2007 to 2009; director of Intelligence (N2) for U.S. Naval Forces Central Command in Bahrain from 2005 to 2007; Intelligence Watch officer in the Combined Air Operations Center at Prince Sultan Air Base in Saudi Arabia in 2003 during early Iraqi Freedom operations; and, N2 for the U.S. Navy’s Task Force 50 in the Northern Arabian Sea from 2001 to 2002 during early Enduring Freedom operations.  Becker has been the Director for Intelligence (J2) on the Joint Chiefs of Staff since September 2013. Previous flag assignments include director for Intelligence with United States Pacific Command in Hawaii, vice director of Intelligence for the Joint Chiefs of Staff in Washington, D.C., and director of Intelligence for the International Security Assistance Force Joint Command in Afghanistan.

Awards 

 Navy Distinguished Service Medal

Education 
1983 Bachelor of Science, U.S. Naval Academy, Annapolis, Maryland
2001 Master’s in Public Administration, Harvard University’s John F. Kennedy School of Government
1991 Diploma, Defense Language Institute (French)
1993 Diploma, Naval Command and Staff College (With Highest Distinction)
1996 Diploma, Armed Forces Staff College

References

Attribution

External links

1961 births
Living people
Place of birth missing (living people)
United States Naval Academy alumni
Harvard Kennedy School alumni
United States Navy rear admirals (upper half)
People with multiple myeloma